The G-class Melbourne trams will be three-section articulated trams to be introduced onto the Melbourne tram network in 2025. The trams will be low-floor, replacing the Z-class and A-class trams and improve accessibility across the network. Construction is scheduled to begin in late 2023.

The trams will be designed, built and maintained by Alstom at its Dandenong factory. The project includes a new maintenance and stabling facility in Maidstone, where the trams will be stored following construction. 

The initial contract includes 100 new trams, which will be the largest domestic order in Australian history, to be maintained by Alstom for 15 years. The trams will be designed to carry 150 passengers and will be 25 metres long. The design is based on the Flexity 2.

History
In 2015, the Andrews Government published a Rolling Stock Strategy. This included ordering new E-class trams, the refurbishment of B-class trams and announced that planning work had begun on the "next generation of trams". The strategy noted that 240 new trams would be needed during the 2020s, to replace Z and A-class trams. These older trams are not accessible, and all new trams ordered since 2000 have been low-floor models.

Bidding process 
In 2019, the Andrews Government announced that 100 Next Generation trams would be produced in the state. The government invited multiple manufacturers to create and submit proposals, before inviting them to a collaborative design process. 

In the Victorian 2020–2021 Budget, the Andrews Government committed $1.48 billion to the project, including a new maintenance and stabling facility, later announced to be built in Maidstone near Highpoint Shopping Centre. The budget also promised approximately 280 jobs in construction and maintenance at the facility. Alstom and a joint venture comprising UGL Rail and CAF were shortlisted to design and build these new trams.

Contract award 
In April 2022, the government awarded the contact to Alstom, and announced further details surrounding the Next Generation trams. It was named the G-Class, keeping up with the Melbourne tram classification system. Construction is scheduled to commence in late 2023 with the first delivered in 2025. The construction process will create 1,900 local jobs across construction of the trams and the new Maidstone facility.

Design
The G-class tram will be based on the Flexity 2, which is used on several tram networks across the world, including the Gold Coast G:Link in Queensland. The tram will be customised to Melbourne's network and will include 65% locally made content. The fleet is designed to use less power than the E-Class so as not to require new power or traction infrastructure. 

Alstom has committed to accessibility in the new trams, in order to follow federal disability regulations. The G-Class will be low-floor and will include additional doors for users of wheelchairs and mobility scooters. The Government will consult accessibility groups during the final design process in order to refine accessibility features.

The tram will be 25 metres long, designed to hold up to 150 passengers with seating for 48.

Naming 
Initially named 'F-class', the trams were named 'G-class' as they are the seventh generation of trams, and the letter G is the seventh letter of the alphabet.

Maidstone tram facility

A new tram facility will be built in the Western Melbourne suburb of Maidstone to serve the new trams, on an old Victoria University site. It will include maintenance and stabling facilities and is to be located along tram route 82. The existing line will be extended to access the new facility. The facility is expected to provide hundreds of jobs in construction and ongoing operation.

References

Alstom trams
Articulated passenger trains
Melbourne tram vehicles
Multiple units of Victoria (Australia)
600 V DC multiple units